Potokar is a surname. Notable people with the surname include:

 Cita Potokar (1915–1993), Slovene painter 
 Majda Potokar (1930–2001), Slovenian film and theater actress
 Nejc Potokar (born 1988), Slovenian footballer
 Tom Potokar (born 1964), British researcher